The men's triple jump event at the 2003 Summer Universiade was held on 30 August in Daegu, South Korea.

Results

References
Results

Athletics at the 2003 Summer Universiade
2003